Bewitched is a 2005 American romantic comedy fantasy film co-written, produced, and directed by Nora Ephron, and starring Nicole Kidman and Will Ferrell alongside an ensemble cast featuring Shirley MacLaine, Michael Caine, Jason Schwartzman, Kristin Chenoweth (in her first film appearance), Heather Burns, Jim Turner, Stephen Colbert, David Alan Grier, Michael Badalucco, Carole Shelley, and Steve Carell. The film follows an actor (Ferrell) who discovers, during the remake of Bewitched, that his co-star (Kidman) is an actual witch.

Produced and distributed by Columbia Pictures with Red Wagon Entertainment, the film is a re-imagining of the television series of the same title (produced by Columbia's Screen Gems television studio, now Sony Pictures Television). Bewitched opened theatrically on June 24, 2005 to negative reviews and failed to meet expectations at the box office.

Plot
Jack Wyatt is a narcissistic actor who is approached to play the role of Darrin in a remake of the 1960s sitcom Bewitched, but insists that an unknown play Samantha. Isabel Bigelow is an actual witch who decides she wants to be normal and moves to Los Angeles to start a new life and becomes friends with her neighbor Maria. She goes to a bookstore to learn how to get a job after seeing an advertisement of Ed McMahon on television. Jack happens to be at the same bookstore after attending some failed Samantha auditions. Jack spots Isabel and persuades her to audition. At the same time, while she's trying to settle into her new life, Isabel's intrusive father Nigel keeps appearing to convince her to return home, despite several rejections from Isabel.

After Isabel impresses the show's producers and writers, Jack finally convinces Isabel to join the show. Also joining the show is legendary actress Iris Smythson as Endora. After a successful taping of the pilot, Isabel happens to overhear a conversation Jack is having with his agent Ritchie. They are talking about how they tricked Isabel to appear without having any lines. Furious, Isabel storms off with Maria and new neighbor friend Nina close behind. She decides she only has three choices: quit, get mad, or live with it. Instead, Isabel's Aunt Clara visits and aids Isabel in casting a spell on Jack in order to make him fall in love with her. At the same time, Nigel is introduced to Iris and becomes infatuated with her.

The hex works and Jack becomes love struck by Isabel, insisting on several script changes to give her some dialogue and jokes, ignoring statements from test groups preferring Isabel over him. Jack's affection for Isabel grows and he asks her out on a date, making Isabel forget about the hex. But when he brings her home, she remembers and reverses it back to when she and Aunt Clara cast it. The next day, rather than the events the hex presented, Jack is outraged by the scores he received and takes his anger out on Isabel, who lashes back at him. Ritchie fires her, and she storms off.

Rather than be angry at her, Jack is fascinated with Isabel and chases after her, accepting all her comments. After another taping (with Isabel getting dialogue), their romance blossoms. But the next day, Jack's former wife Sheila arrives, determined to woo Jack back. Isabel sees this and casts a spell on her making her sign the divorce papers and have her decide to move to Iceland. Jack, thrilled, announces he will be throwing a party at his house celebrating the divorce.

Nigel attends the party with Iris and when Nigel begins flirting with much younger guests, Iris reveals that she is also a witch and casts a spell on each girl. When Jack makes a toast stating truth will be revealed with everyone, Isabel decides to tell Jack she's a witch. At first, thinking she's simply an amateur magician, Jack finally believes her when she levitates him with her broom. Jack becomes frightened and shoos her away with a stick. Offended and heartbroken, Isabel flies off.

Jack takes this hard, being brought to the studios by the police and becoming disenchanted with the project. Isabel decides to return home as she no longer wishes to stay. Jack, imagining himself on the Conan O'Brien Show, is visited by Uncle Arthur. Arthur convinces Jack not to let Isabel leave, because Jack still loves her and wouldn't be able to return for 100 years (which is later proven to be a lie Arthur made up to inspire Jack). Arthur drives him to the studio where he finds Isabel at the set. Jack apologizes to her and tells her he wants to marry her. Six months later, they do get married and move into their new neighborhood (which resembles the neighborhood in the series, with the Kravitzes living right across the street).

Cast
 Nicole Kidman as Isabel Bigelow / Samantha Stephens
 Will Ferrell as Jack Wyatt / Darrin Stephens
 Shirley MacLaine as Iris Smythson / Endora
 Michael Caine as Nigel Bigelow
 Jason Schwartzman as Ritchie
 Kristin Chenoweth as Maria Kelly
 Heather Burns as Nina
 Jim Turner as Larry
 Stephen Colbert as Stu Robison
 David Alan Grier as Jim Fields
 Michael Badalucco as Joey Props
 Katie Finneran as Sheila Wyatt

Actual characters from the series
 Carole Shelley as Aunt Clara
 Steve Carell as Uncle Arthur
 Amy Sedaris as Gladys Kravitz
 Richard Kind as Abner Kravitz

Cameo appearances
 Ed McMahon as himself
 Conan O'Brien as himself
 James Lipton as himself
 Nick Lachey as Cooley
 Kate Walsh as Nadine
 Abbey McBride as Matilda
 Jen Taylor as Park Ranger Patti Crawford
 Teri Robinson as Mary Bryson
 Victor Williams as Officer James Bryan
 Roxanne Beckford as Francine Jones

Production
Bewitched had complicated development process that took nearly a decade. Rob Morrow and Cynthia Nixon were in talks to star in an adaptation directed by actor Ted Bessell and written by Broadway's Douglas Carter Beane, before Bessell died in 1996. Jim Carrey was in talks to play Darrin. Several writers, including Laurice Elehwany, made changes to the script. Nora Ephron was ultimately hired in 2003. Principal photography took place from the end of 2004 to the beginning of 2005.

Release

Box office
The film was originally planned for release in July 2005, but was later pushed back to its eventual release date, June 24, 2005. Budgeted at $85 million, it achieved a worldwide gross of $131.4 million, considered a "box office dud". The total gross for the United States was $63.3 million, with international at $68.1 million. The film was released in the United Kingdom on August 19, 2005, and opened at #2, behind Charlie and the Chocolate Factory.

Critical reception
On the review aggregate website Rotten Tomatoes, it holds a 24% approval rating, based on 187 reviews with an average score of 4.61/10. The website's critics consensus reads: "Bewitched is haunted by scattered laughs and a lack of direction". On Metacritic, the film has a score of 34 out of 100, based on 39 reviews, indicating "generally unfavorable reviews". Audiences polled by CinemaScore gave the film an average grade of "C+" on an A+ to F scale.

The New York Times called the film "an unmitigated disaster". Australian critics Margaret Pomeranz and David Stratton gave the film three and half stars out of five stars. Both said that Kidman captured the original character authentically.

Awards

The film earned Nicole Kidman and Will Ferrell a Golden Raspberry Award for Worst Screen Couple. The film was also nominated for Worst Director, Worst Actor (Will Ferrell), Worst Screenplay, and Worst Remake or Sequel.

Home media
The film was released on VHS and DVD on October 25, 2005 by Sony Pictures Home Entertainment. It included deleted scenes, such as Jack and Isabel's wedding and an extended version of Isabel getting mad, several making of featurettes, a trivia game, and an audio commentary by the director. 

In Australia, a Blu-ray version was released on February 7, 2018.

References

External links
 
 
 
 

Bewitched
2005 films
2005 fantasy films
2005 romantic comedy films
2000s English-language films
2000s fantasy comedy films
2000s romantic fantasy films
American fantasy comedy films
American romantic comedy films
American romantic fantasy films
Columbia Pictures films
Films about actors
Films about television
Films about witchcraft
Films based on television series
Films directed by Nora Ephron
Films produced by Douglas Wick
Films produced by Lucy Fisher
Films scored by George Fenton
Films set in Los Angeles
Films shot in Los Angeles
Films with screenplays by Nora Ephron
Golden Raspberry Award winning films
2000s American films